As Kanoume Apopse Mian Arhi is the title of the debut studio album by singer Anna Vissi, released in Greece and Cyprus by Minos in 1977.

Album information
In the 1970s in the Greek music industry, the prerequisite to recording a personal album was to prove one's artistic merits by collaborating and recording with other established musicians. Having proved herself by collaborating with the legendary Mikis Theodorakis and other influential artists like George Dalaras, record company Minos finally granted Vissi the privilege of recording her debut personal studio album. The album featured 11 new songs and 2 songs previously included in various composer albums.

The lead single, "As Kanoume Apopse Mian Arhi" was sung by Vissi at the Thessaloniki Song Festival, on September 26, 1977, prior to the album release, winning first prize.

In 1987, "As Kanoume Apopse Mian Arhi" was among the selection of albums that Minos-EMI decided to release on CD as it was still popular. The Minos EMI reissue for the back catalogue Minos EMI CD Club series, which was regularly shipped in shops throughout the years, is shown here.

In 2006 it was re-released in a remasted edition including a bonus CD with additional songs from her early career with Minos featured on albums of other successful artists. 
In 2007 the songs of the album were included on EMI's boxset of Vissi recordings Back to Time (Complete EMI Years) which, despite of being a box set, charted on the Top 10 of sales charts.

Music
Music and lyrics are by Doros Georgiadis, Spiros Blassopoulos, Antonis Vardis, Panos Falaras, Giannis Spanos, Manos Eleftheriou, M. Terzis, G. Karakatsanis, G. Gerasimidis, and K. Loizos.

Track listing

Original version
 "As Kanoume Apopse Mian Arhi" (Let's make a start tonight)
 "Agapise Me" (Love me)
 "Oi Kiklades" (The Cyclades)
 "Kladi Rodias" (Branch of pomegranate)
 "Sou Dosa Na Peis" (I gave you to drink)
 "Mi Bazeis Mavro" (Don't put black)
 "Namouna Sta Cheria Sou" (I was in the hands of your boat)
 "Oi Nikimeni Eimaste Emeis" (We are the losers)
 "Apo Edo Kai Apo Kei" (From here and from there)
 "Geia Sas Triantafylla" (Hello roses)
 "I Agapi Sou Sholeio" (Your school love)
 "To Tali Tampo"
 "Ilie Mou" (My sun)

2006 remastered edition

Disc 1: The original album
 "As Kanoume Apopse Mian Arhi"
 "Agapise Me"
 "Oi Kiklades"
 "Kladi Rodias"
 "Sou Dosa Na Peis"
 "Mi Bazeis Mavro"
 "Namouna Sta Cheria Sou"
 "Oi Nikimeni Eimaste Emeis"
 "Apo Edo Kai Apo Kei"
 "Geia Sas Triantafylla"
 "I Agapi Sou Sholeio"
 "To Tali Tampo"
 "Ilie Mou"

Disc 2: Recordings 1974-1978
 "S' Agapo" (I love you)
 "Dipsasa Stin Porta Sou" (I'm thirsty at your door)
 "Paramithi Ksehasmeno" (Forgotten fairytale)
 "Gia Tin Agapi Pes Mou" (Tell me about love)
 "To Palikari" (The stalwart)
 "To Palio To Aeroplano" (The old plane)
 "Savvatiatika" (On a Saturday)
 "Nikisame" feat Doros Georgiades (We won)
 "Krivame Tin Agapi Mas" (We hide our love)
 "Giati Gelas" (Why are you laughing?)
 "Oute Ena S'Agapo" (Not even one "I love you")
 "San Ta Pinasmena Peristeria" (Like hungry pigeons)
 "Mia Mikri Psihoula" (A little soul)
 "Thelo" (I want)
 "Oh! Maria" (Oh! Maria)
 "Kos Nobel" (Mr. Nobel)

Singles
"As Kanoume Apopse Mian Arhi" (#1 for 1 week)
"Mi Vazis Mavro" (#4)
"Na Mouna Sta Heria Sou Karavi" (#6)
"Sou Dosa Na Pieis" (#10)

Credits and personnel

Personnel

Original LP & CD release
2006 Remastered edition CD 1
Andreas Aggelakis - lyrics
Manos Eleftheriou - lyrics
Panos Falaras - lyrics
Doros Georgiadis - music, lyrics
G. Gerasimidis - music, lyrics
Dimitris Iatropoulos - lyrics
Tasos Karakatsanis - music
K. Loïzos - music
Kostis Palamas - lyrics
Polydoros - lyrics
Yiannis Spanos - music
Sotia Tsotou - lyrics
Antonis Vardis - music, guitars
Anna Vissi - vocals
Spiros Vlassopoulos - music
2006 Remastered edition CD 2
Akos Daskalopoulos (alias: M. Korfiatis) - lyrics
Manos Eleftheriou - lyrics
Manos Eleftheriou - lyrics
Doros Georgiadis - music, lyrics, vocals
Christos Gkartzos - music

Giorgos Hadjinasios - music
Nikos Karvelas - music
Stavros Kougioumtzis - music, lyrics
Spiros Papavasiliou- music
Lakis Teäzis - lyrics
Barbara Tsimboulis - lyrics
Sotia Tsotou - lyrics
Anna Vissi - vocals

Production
Achilleas Theofilou - production management
Giorgos Lefentarios - production assistance
Peter McNamee - recording engineering at Studio Polysound
Doros Georgiadis- arrangements, instrumentation, orchestral conduction on tracks 1,6, 12
Tasos Karakatsanis - arrangements, instrumentation, orchestral conduction on tracks 2, 3, 4, 7, 8, 9, 10, 13
Yiannis Spanos - arrangements, instrumentation, orchestral conduction 5, 11

Design
Jacques Iakovides - photos
Th. & M. Voulgaridi-Hatzistyli - cover design

Credits adapted from the album's liner notes.

References

Anna Vissi albums
1977 albums
Greek-language albums
Minos EMI albums